The Yearbook of the Association of Pacific Coast Geographers is a peer-reviewed annual academic journal covering education and research in geography. It is an official journal of the Association of Pacific Coast Geographers (APCG) and was established in 1935. It has been published  annually except during the war years of 1943-1946. Its first editor-in-chief was Otis Willard Freeman (Eastern Washington University; vols. 1-5, 1935–1940). Its longest-serving editor was Darrick Danta (California State University, Northridge; vols. 59-68, 1997–2006). The current editor is James Craine (California State University, Northridge).

From 1965 through 1996 (vols. 27-58) the yearbook was published by Oregon State University Press, from 1997 through 1999 (vols. 59-61) by the APCG, and since 2000 (vol. 62) by the University of Hawaii Press. Its first electronic edition appeared in 2004 on Project MUSE.

External links 
 

English-language journals
Publications established in 1935
Geography journals
Annual journals
Academic journals associated with learned and professional societies
University of Hawaiʻi Press academic journals